Amber Penrith is an English rugby union player. She represented  at the 2010 Women's Rugby World Cup.

Penrith came out of retirement in 2009 to play in a three test series against New Zealand after announcing her retirement in 2008.

References

External links

1985 births
Living people
England women's international rugby union players
English female rugby union players
Female rugby union players
Place of birth missing (living people)
Rugby union players from Stroud
21st-century English women